Melissa  Faith  Storwick (born November 13, 1998 in Calgary, Alberta), known professionally as FAANGS (formerly Charlie), is a Canadian singer-songwriter and actress. She was the winner of The Next Star season 4, and starred as Piper Gray in YTV's Some Assembly Required.

Storwick now records music under the name FAANGS and has written songs for Ashnikko and Rico Nasty.

Personal life
Storwick stated in an interview for The Next Star that she is inspired by all types of music. Growing up in Calgary, Storwick was obsessed with watching performers on TV, always ready to entertain strangers on trips to the grocery store with her mom. She was encouraged to take up hobbies to keep her mind active outside of school and was put into lessons to learn the trumpet and violin, eventually focussing on the piano above all, dropping the tuition and teaching herself by ear. She started to sing as she was playing, mum and dad constantly reaffirming her practice as leisure time. Eventually she was allowed to take up musical theatre in school, the challenge of combining singing, acting and dancing speaking to her burgeoning desire to entertain. Her musical heroes were Whitney Houston, Christina Aguilera, Billie Joe Armstrong, and Freddie Mercury. Storwick grew up in Calgary, Alberta with her family. She has two sisters, Annie and Amanda Storwick and one brother, Jack Storwick. Charlie used to attend the Calgary Waldorf School. She now lives around LA as FAANGS.

Career

The Next Star

In May, 2011, after hearing about the auditions from a friend, she chose to audition for The Next Star because she wanted to "take it to the next level", which terrified her parents. Out of thousands of young hopefuls, Storwick made it to the Top 16. She later made it to the Top 6, along with contestants Parker Schmidt, Milly Benzu, Shania Fillmore, April Llave, and JD Meeboer. At the finale, it was announced that she won Season 4 of The Next Star.

Throughout the season, Storwick performed a total of 12 songs. (One being her audition, and two being music videos) The first song she performed was "Stuttering" by Fefe Dobson. After meeting her music producer, Zubin Thakkar, they both created her new song titled "Good as Gone". Along with the rest of the top six, she performed a preview of her song. She later performed a battle song with contestant Parker; herself with "Sweet Escape" and Parker with "Grenade". Then for the group battle, she performed "Whip my Hair"; with April and Parker v.s. "I Love Rock and Roll" performed by Shania, JD and, Milly. Further on in the series, she performed "My Guy" for the Motown segment of the season. Storwick also performed a Motown song with contestants Shania and April titled "Baby Love". At the finale after she won, she performed Jessie J's "Price Tag".

Towards the end of the season, Storwick also created a music video titled "Good As Gone", and created a group music video, "Turn It Up Up Up" with her and the other top 6 members. On September 25, 2011, she won The Next Star Season 4, due to the spiking number of votes over the season. Her single, "Good As Gone" along with the rest of the top 6 singles are now available on iTunes and on The Next Star season 4 album.

In 2012, Storwick released her new single, "Glitter in the Sky". The music video made its first appearance on Monday, July 16 on YTV at 10:30 AST. Her other song titled "Paper Heart" was also released on July 16.

In 2012, Storwick appeared on YTV's The Zone with her music producer Zubin Thakkar, for an interview by host Carlos Bustamante. From there she performed an acoustic version her new singles "Glitter in the Sky" and "Paper Heart". Storwick stated in the interview that she is working on pursuing an acting career in the future.

Storwick is also the first ever contestant on The Next Star to get one million views on YouTube.

Some Assembly Required and FAANGS

It was announced in 2013 that Storwick would be playing the role of Piper Gray in the upcoming YTV show, Some Assembly Required. The show premiered January 6, 2014 and ended on June 6, 2016.

In 2015, she released her formal debut single Ghosts. It has received a feature in this week’s Nielsen newsletter. The song moved up the Hot AC chart and bubbling under CHR and Emerging Artists. “Ghosts” was released through Vancouver’s Westsonic Music, and for it Charlie was named this month’s Bell Future Star.

After the show ended, Storwick turned her attention back to music and began self-releasing her own material. She was invited to a writing workshop organised by Canadian collection society SOCAN, and it was there that she met British producer BHAV who invited her back to the UK for further sessions after her 18th birthday. Storwick travelled to Berlin for writing sessions with German quartet Hitimpulse, living in their studio for four months, working on songs. Storwick then ended up signing with Sony in Germany under the supervision of the European president Daniel Lieberberg. Storwick moved to LA and began writing songs for other artists and on her new persona FAANGS, a name inspired by the vicious city she now called home.

She released her debut single under the name FAANGS ttled “HUH” on October 23, 2020, which was followed up by 4 more singles until the release of her debut album TEETH OUT on November 12, 2021.

Filmography

Discography

EPs/ALBUMS

Singles

Charlie

As lead artist

FAANGS

As a featured artist
That's You - Brandon Taylor featuring FAANGS (2019)
Shy - Karate Kactus featuring FAANGS (2019)
Don't Talk to Me - N.F.I. and Riton featuring FAANGS (2019)
Sicko - Felix Jaehn featuring Gashi and FAANGS (2020)

Songwriting credits

Music videos

References

External links
 https://web.archive.org/web/20110925073750/http://nextstar.ytv.com/finalist_sub.aspx?id=4
 
 https://calgaryherald.com/entertainment/topic.html?t=Person&q=Suzie+McNeil

1998 births
21st-century Canadian actresses
Actresses from Calgary
Canadian child actresses
Canadian child singers
Canadian television actresses
Living people
Musicians from Calgary
Participants in Canadian reality television series
Canadian women pop singers
21st-century Canadian women singers